Alexander Peresvet – also spelled Peresviet (Russian: Александр Пересвет, d. 8 September 1380) – was a Russian Orthodox monk who fought in a single combat with the Tatar champion Temir-murza (known in most Russian sources as Chelubey or Chelibey) at the opening of the Battle of Kulikovo (8 September 1380). The two men killed each other.

Peresvet is believed to have hailed from the Bryansk area and to have taken the monastic habit at the Rostov Monastery of Saints Boris and Gleb. He moved to the Monastery of Pereslavl-Zalessky, in the service of Dmitry Donskoy. He later moved to the Trinity Lavra where he became a follower of Sergius of Radonezh. Alexander and his friend Rodion Oslyabya joined the Russian troops set out to fight the Tatars under the leadership of Mamai.

The battle of Kulikovo was opened by single combat between the two champions. The Russian champion was Alexander Peresvet. The champion of the Golden Horde was Temir-murza. The champions killed each other in the first charge. According to a Russian legend, Peresvet did not fall from the saddle, while Temir-murza did.

Peresvet's body, together with that of his brother-in-arms Oslyabya, was brought to Moscow. The two men were buried at the 15th-century Theotokos Church in Simonov Monastery.

Commemoration

 Pereswetoff-Morath, a bayor (Russo-Swedish nobility) family, have been claimed to be descendants of Peresvet.
 The Russian Peresvet battleship class, ships of which saw action in the Russo-Japanese War
 A Volga boat is named Alexander Peresvet
 The town of Peresvet near Moscow
 A fast train running between Moscow and St. Petersburg since 2003.
 33rd Special purpose unit of Internal Troops
 Russian military laser ‘Peresvet’ named so after a 2018 'name that weapon' vote

References

In Russian Language
 Титов А. А. Предание о ростовских князьях. М., 1885
 Описание Свято-Димитриевского монастыря в г. Скопине. Издательство Свято-Димитриевского монастыря, 2000.
 Рязанские епархиальные ведомости. 1891, No. 2, 3.
 Лошиц Ю. М. Дмитрий Донской., М., 1996
 Розанов Н. П. История церкви Рождества Пресвятые Богородицы на Старом Симонове в Москве. К её пятисотолетию (1370—1870). М., 1870
 Благословение преподобного Сергия. Под редакцией В.Силовьева. Изд.совет РПЦ, 2005

Notes

Russian military leaders
Russian knights
Russian Orthodox monks
Russian folklore characters
1380 deaths
14th-century births
Russian duellists